Skyworks may refer to:
City of Perth Skyworks, an annual fireworks display in Perth, Australia
Skyworks Global, an American autogyro research and development company
Skyworks Solutions, a manufacturer of semiconductor chips for communications technologies, headquartered in Woburn, Massachusetts